The Birthday Cake is a 2021 American crime thriller film directed by Jimmy Giannopoulos, from a screenplay by Diomedes Raul Bermudez, Shiloh Fernandez and Giannopoulos. It is the feature directorial debut for Giannopoulos, who previously directed short films and worked with Miley Cyrus, A$AP Rocky, Kid Cudi, and others on music projects. This is the last movie Paul Sorvino starred in at the time of his death on July 25, 2022.

The Birthday Cake was released in the United States on June 18, 2021.

Plot 
Young Italian-American, Giovanni "Gio", reluctantly continues his family's annual tradition of bringing a cake to the house of his Uncle Angelo, a local crime lord, to mark the anniversary of his mob-connected father's passing ten years earlier. It is not long before he witnesses a murder along the way, that will force him to learn the truth behind his father's death and change his life forever.

Cast

Production 
In August 2019, it was announced that Ewan McGregor, Shiloh Fernandez and Val Kilmer joined the cast of the film. Producers include Diomedes Raul Bermudez of Purpose Films, Siena Oberman of Artemis Pictures and Danny Sawaf of Oceana Studios. Jamin O'Brien, Jason Weinberg and Greg Lauritano are executive producers. Cassius Corrigan is a Co-Producer.

Reception

References

External links
 

Films about birthdays
American crime thriller films
2021 directorial debut films
2020s English-language films
2020s American films